Miguel Oswaldo Loaiza Tardio (born 13 January 1983 in Santa Cruz de la Sierra) is a Bolivian footballer who plays for Real Potosí as a midfielder.

Club career
Nicknamed Micky, his previous clubs include Bolívar, Real Potosí in two periods, Universitario de Sucre, San José and Blooming.

International career
Loaiza made his debut for Bolivia in a March 2011 friendly match against Panama, his sole international game.

References

External links

 Profile at BoliviaGol.com 
 
 

1983 births
Living people
Sportspeople from Santa Cruz de la Sierra
Association football midfielders
Bolivian footballers
Bolivia international footballers
Club Bolívar players
Club Real Potosí players
Universitario de Sucre footballers
Club San José players
Club Blooming players